Glafiro Salinas Mendiola (born 31 May 1946) is a Mexican politician affiliated with the National Action Party (PAN). He is currently a deputy in the LXII Legislature of the Mexican Congress representing Tamaulipas.

References

1946 births
Living people
People from Nuevo Laredo
National Action Party (Mexico) politicians
21st-century Mexican politicians
Politicians from Tamaulipas
Deputies of the LXII Legislature of Mexico
Members of the Chamber of Deputies (Mexico) for Tamaulipas